María José Rienda Contreras (born 12 June 1975) is a former World Cup alpine ski racer. She served as the President of the Consejo Superior de Deportes and Secretary of State for Sports of Spain from June 2018 to January 2020.

Biography
Rienda Contreras has 6 World Cup victories, all in giant slalom. Her victories in 2005 were the first Spanish World Cup victories since Blanca Fernández Ochoa won in December 1991. María José Rienda Contreras represented Spain in five Winter Olympics.

Her interest for this sport began when her father began to work on the Station of Sierra Nevada already at the age of nine she was possessing her first pair of skis. After some national success, she joined the Spanish national team at age 14. On 25 October 2003 Rienda Contreras scored her first World Cup podium, by coming third in the giant slalom in Sölden, Austria. She scored two more podiums that season and finished third in the giant slalom World Cup that season.

The following season, 2004–2005, began with a new podium, repeating the third position of the previous year in Sölden. Later she scored another third position, now in St. Moritz, Switzerland. On 20 February 2005 Maria Jose Rienda Contreras scored her first World Cup win, in the giant slalom in Åre, Sweden. Later she scored another victory, this time in the giant slalom in Lenzerheide, Switzerland. Also this season she finished third in the giant slalom World Cup standings.

After retiring from competition, she became involved in sport management. In June 2018 she was appointed Secretary of State for Sports by the Spanish government.

World Cup victories

References

External links
 
 
 

Spanish female alpine skiers
Alpine skiers at the 1994 Winter Olympics
Alpine skiers at the 1998 Winter Olympics
Alpine skiers at the 2002 Winter Olympics
Alpine skiers at the 2006 Winter Olympics
Alpine skiers at the 2010 Winter Olympics
Olympic alpine skiers of Spain
1975 births
Living people